Sara bint Ahmed Al Sudairi ( Sara bint Aḥmed Al Sudairī; died 1910) was a Saudi royal. She was a member of the Al Sudairi family and the wife of Abdul Rahman bin Faisal who was the last ruler of the Second Saudi State. Sara was the mother of King Abdulaziz or Ibn Saud who was the founder of Saudi Arabia.

Biography
Sara bint Ahmed was a member of the Al Sudairi family who are part of the Dawasir tribe settled in Al Ghat that is an oasis town located in central Arabia nearly 250 kilometers northwest of Riyadh.

Her mother was Hessa bint Muhanna bin Saleh Al Nuwairan. The father of Sara was Ahmed bin Muhammad bin Turki bin Suleiman Al Sudairi who was nicknamed Ahmed Al Kabeer (The Great). He was assigned by Faisal bin Turki, the ruler of the Second Saudi State, to different regions as an administrator, including Al Ahsa where Sara was born. He also served in Al Ghat and Buraimi, and died in 1860. Sara's uncle, Abdullah bin Muhammad, also served as the governor of Al Ahsa under Faisal bin Turki. 

Sara had six brothers, Muhammad, Turki, Abdul Mohsen, Abdulaziz, Saad, and Abdul Rahman, and two sisters, Falwa and Noura. Of them Muhammad was made the governor of Al Ahsa following the death of his father who had been in the post until his death. Another, Turki, was the governor of Saudi Oman. Sara's sister Falwa married Muhammad bin Faisal bin Turki, and Noura was the spouse of Jiluwi bin Turki bin Abdullah. Noura and Jiluwi were the paternal grandparents of Al Jawhara bint Musaed who was the mother of King Khalid, Prince Muhammad and Princess Al Anoud. 

Sara's first husband, Abdullah bin Hamad bin Abdul Jabbar, died, and they did not have any child. Then she married Abdul Rahman bin Faisal. Her children from this second marriage were Faisal, Noura, Abdulaziz, Bazza, Haya and Saad. She accompanied her husband and children when they were forced to leave Riyadh in 1891.

Sara was a tall woman like her son, Abdulaziz. She died in Riyadh in the late 1910. However, there is another report giving her death year as 1908. She was buried in Al Oud cemetery in Riyadh.

Ancestry

References

Sara
Sara
1910 deaths
Sara
Sara
Sara